Hemsön is an island in the Bothnian Sea, northeast of Härnösand, at the mouth of the Ångerman River. The area is 54 km² and the population is 140 (2006).

References

Islands of Västernorrland County